Uttara FC is a football team from Dhaka, Bangladesh. The team is currently one of Bangladesh Championship League (BCL).

History 
On 5 February 2020, Bangladesh Football Federation gave the green signal to the club to participate in 2019–20 Bangladesh Championship League. The prime purpose of the club to bring back professionalism in Bangladesh football arena.

Uttara FC played there first match at 2021 Bangladesh Championship League 7 February 2021 and won against NoFeL SC

Competitive record

Current squad

Current technical staff

Head coaches

References 

Uttara
Association football clubs established in 2020
Sport in Dhaka
Football clubs in Bangladesh
2020 establishments in Bangladesh